SoFi Stadium is a 70,240-seat sports and entertainment indoor stadium in the Los Angeles suburb of Inglewood, California, United States. SoFi occupies the former site of the Hollywood Park Racetrack,  from Los Angeles International Airport and immediately southeast of Kia Forum. Opened in September 2020, the fixed-roof stadium is home to the National Football League (NFL)'s Los Angeles Rams and Los Angeles Chargers, as well as the annual LA Bowl in college football. The facility is a component of Hollywood Park, a master planned neighborhood in development on the site of the former racetrack. Hollywood Park Casino re-opened in a new building on the property in October 2016, becoming the development's first establishment to open.

SoFi Stadium is one of two stadiums currently shared by a pair of NFL teams, the other being MetLife Stadium in East Rutherford, New Jersey, shared by the New York Giants and New York Jets. It is the first facility outside of the New York metropolitan area to host two NFL teams simultaneously; the other three since the 1970 AFL–NFL merger have been Shea Stadium, Giants Stadium and MetLife Stadium.

In North American professional sports, it is the fourth facility in Greater Los Angeles shared by more than one team from the same league. The other venues have been Crypto.com Arena, which has hosted both of the city's National Basketball Association (NBA) teams, the Los Angeles Lakers and Los Angeles Clippers, since 1999 (although this arrangement will end by 2024); Dignity Health Sports Park, which was home to Major League Soccer (MLS)'s LA Galaxy and the now-defunct Chivas USA from 2005 to 2014; and Dodger Stadium, which was shared by Major League Baseball (MLB)'s Los Angeles Dodgers and Los Angeles Angels from 1962 to 1965.

The stadium hosted Super Bowl LVI on February 13, 2022, the College Football Playoff National Championship on January 9, 2023, and is scheduled to host WrestleMania 39 from April 1–2, 2023, the 2023 CONCACAF Gold Cup Final on July 16, 2023, multiple matches of the 2026 FIFA World Cup, and the opening and closing ceremonies (as well as soccer and archery events) of the 2028 Summer Olympics.

Design 

SoFi Stadium was designed by HKS and consists of the stadium itself, a pedestrian plaza, and a performance venue. Above the stadium is an independently supported translucent canopy which covers the stadium proper, the adjacent pedestrian plaza, and the attached performance venue. The million-square-foot canopy is made up of 302 ETFE panels, 46 of which can be opened to provide ventilation, supported by a cable net. The canopy has 27,000 embedded LED pucks, which can display images and video that can also be seen from airplanes flying into Los Angeles International Airport. The stadium bowl has open sides and seats 70,240 spectators for most events, with the ability to expand by 30,000 seats for larger events. Despite the roof, the open sides of the stadium still make it vulnerable to lightning delays, with the first such delay in an NFL game between the Chargers and the Las Vegas Raiders on October 4, 2021. The attached music and theatre venue, known as the YouTube Theater, has a capacity of 6,000 seats. The stadium and performance center are considered to be separate facilities under one roof.

Another component of the stadium's design is the Infinity Screen by Samsung, an ovular, double-sided 4K HDR video board, the first of its kind, that is suspended from the roof over the field. Formerly known as "the Oculus" before a name change, the structure weighs  and displays 80 million pixels. The Infinity Screen also houses the stadium's 260-speaker audio system, as well as 56 5G wireless antennas.

Outdoor sports in California are usually played on grass due to the state's highly favorable climate. However, a grass field is very difficult to maintain to an acceptable standard when it is used by more than one gridiron football team. Because SoFi Stadium was intended from the outset to be used by two NFL teams, the designers opted not to install a natural playing surface. The stadium joined California Memorial Stadium as the only major sports facilities in California currently in use to have artificial turf installed.

Awards
SoFi Stadium has won a number of industry awards for its design, including, but not limited to:
 "Stadium of the Year" in StadiumDB's Jury Award.
 "Outstanding Architectural Engineering Project" of 2021 by the American Society of Civil Engineers.
 The "Excellence in Action" Award to West Basin Municipal Water District (West Basin), the City of Inglewood, and other project partners for the SoFi Stadium Recycled Water Project.

History

Location discussions

The stadium site was previously home to Hollywood Park, later sold and referred to as Betfair Hollywood Park, which was a thoroughbred race course from 1938 until it was shut down for racing and training in December 2013. Most of the complex was demolished in 2014 to make way for new construction with the rest demolished in late 2016 after the Hollywood Park Casino, which remained open after the track itself closed, moved to a new building. The current stadium was not the first stadium proposed for the site. The site was almost home to an NFL stadium two decades earlier. In May 1995, after the departure of the Rams for St. Louis, the National Football League team owners approved, by a 27–1 vote with two abstentions, a resolution supporting a plan to build a $200 million, privately funded stadium on property owned by Hollywood Park for the Los Angeles Raiders. Al Davis, who was then the Raiders owner, balked and refused the deal over a stipulation that he would have had to accept a second team at the stadium.

On January 31, 2014, the Los Angeles Times reported that Stan Kroenke, owner of the St. Louis Rams, purchased a  parcel of land just north of the Hollywood Park site in the area that had been studied by the National Football League in the past for the 1995 Raiders proposal and that the league at one point attempted to purchase. This set off immediate speculation as to what Kroenke's intentions were for the site: After the site's former Hollywood Park owners gave up on getting an NFL stadium for the site in the mid-2000s it was sold and planned to be a Walmart Supercenter; however, in 2014, most of the speculation centered on the site as a possible stadium site or training facility for the Rams. NFL Commissioner Roger Goodell represented that Kroenke informed the league of the purchase. As an NFL owner, any purchase of land in which a potential stadium could be built must be disclosed to the league. Speculation about the Rams' returning to their home of nearly fifty years had already been discussed when Kroenke was one of the finalists in bidding for ownership in the Los Angeles Dodgers, but speculation increased when the news broke that the Rams owner had a possible stadium site in hand.

Nearly a year went by without a word from Kroenke about his intentions for the land, as he failed to ever address the St. Louis media, or the Hollywood Park Land Company, about what the site may be used for. There was, however, speculation about the future of the Rams franchise until it was reported that the National Football League would not be allowing any franchise relocation for the 2015 season.

On January 5, 2015, Stockbridge Capital Group, the owners of the Hollywood Park Land Company, announced that it had partnered with Kroenke Sports & Entertainment to add the northern  parcel to the rest of the development project and build a multi-purpose 70,240-seat stadium designed for the NFL. The project would include the stadium and a performance arts venue attached to the stadium with up to 6,000 seats. On February 24, 2015, the Inglewood City Council approved plans with a 5–0 unanimous vote to combine the  plot of land with the larger Hollywood Park development and rezone the area to include sports and entertainment capabilities. This essentially cleared the way for developers to begin construction on the venue as planned in December 2015.

It was reported in early February 2015 that "earth was being moved" and the site was being graded in preparation for the construction that would begin later in the year.

The project was competing directly with a rival proposal. On February 19, 2015, the Oakland Raiders and the San Diego Chargers announced plans for a privately financed $1.85 billion stadium that the two teams would have built in Carson if they were to move to the Los Angeles market. The project was, like the Inglewood project, also approved to move forward and cleared for development. The two projects spent the remainder of 2015 jockeying for the right to get approved by the NFL.

Construction 

The NFL approved the Inglewood proposal and the Rams' relocation back to Los Angeles, 30–2, on January 12, 2016, over the rival proposal. On July 14, 2016, it was announced that Turner Construction and AECOM Hunt would oversee construction of the stadium and that the architectural firm HKS, Inc. would design the stadium. The stadium design had been under review by the FAA for more than a year because of concerns about how the structure would interact with radar at nearby Los Angeles International Airport (LAX). On December 16, 2016, it was reported in Sports Business Journal that the FAA had declined to issue permits for cranes needed to build the structure. "We're not going to evaluate any crane applications until our concerns with the overall project are resolved," said FAA spokesman Ian Gregor. The FAA had previously recommended building the stadium at another site because of the risks posed to LAX—echoing concerns raised by former United States Secretary of Homeland Security Tom Ridge. The Rams held the groundbreaking construction ceremony at the stadium site on November 17, 2016. The ceremony featured NFL Commissioner Roger Goodell and Rams' owner Stan Kroenke. On December 23, 2016, the FAA approved the large construction cranes to build the stadium.

On May 18, 2017, developers announced that record rainfall in the area had postponed the stadium's completion and opening from 2019 until the 2020 NFL season. On August 8, 2017, the LA Stadium Premiere Center opened in Playa Vista, featuring interactive multimedia displays and models showcasing the design and features of the new stadium (with a particular focus on prospective buyers of premium suites and seats at the facility).

In March 2018, the NFL announced that it would relocate its NFL Media unit (which manages the NFL's in-house media units, including NFL Network, digital properties, and NFL Films among other units) from Culver City to a new  facility neighboring the stadium in the Hollywood Park development including a studio capable of hosting audiences, as well as an outdoor studio. The new facility was completed in 2021. On June 26, 2018, the new stadium was ceremonially topped out.

As of August 2019, one year before the planned opening, Rams chief operating officer Kevin Demoff stated that the stadium was 75 percent complete.

In January 2020, Demoff announced that construction was 85 percent complete, with roof and oculus work, as well as seat installation, still in progress. In February 2020, a large crane collapsed—no one was injured. Amidst the COVID-19 pandemic and stay-at-home orders issued by the California state government in March 2020, construction (exempted as a critical infrastructure project) continued with social distancing and heightened health and safety standards. Demoff acknowledged that there was a possibility that its completion could be delayed, explaining that it was "not the time you want to be finishing a stadium, in this environment as you prepare", but that "our stadium, and I believe the Raiders' stadium as well, will both be amazing when they are finished and when they will begin play, which will certainly happen in the near future, whether that's in July, August, September, in 2021". Five construction workers were reported to have tested positive, including an ironworker who had worked in an assembly area away from the structure, and a backfill operator who had worked in an "isolated area outside the building" and had not entered it. On June 5, 2020, construction on the facility was temporarily halted after an ironworker fell to his death through a hole in the roof created by the removal of a panel for maintenance. On June 9, 2020, construction on the facility resumed everywhere but the roof.

Cancelled or postponed opening events, first events

The entirety of the NFL preseason was also cancelled; the Rams held their first practice at the stadium on August 22, 2020. On August 25, the Chargers and Rams announced that all games at the stadium would be held behind closed doors "until further notice". An official ribbon-cutting ceremony was hosted on September 8, ahead of its first NFL event on September 13—featuring the Rams hosting and defeating the Dallas Cowboys 20–17 in the first Sunday-night game of the season. The first athletic contest with spectators present occurred on May 15, 2021, with LA Giltinis defeating Utah Warriors, 38–27, in a Major League Rugby match before 4,880 spectators. The Los Angeles Rams hosted the Chicago Bears for the first NFL regular-season game at the stadium with fans in attendance on September 12, 2021, a 34–14 Rams win before a crowd of 70,445.

All of the originally announced summer concerts at the venue were cancelled or postponed by the pandemic, including a two-night stop on Taylor Swift's Lover Fest tour on July 25 and 26, 2020 (originally announced as the stadium's grand opening and later cancelled, though she will conclude the U.S. leg of her upcoming tour at the stadium in 2023), and tours by Guns N' Roses (2020 Tour, they would perform at nearby BMO Stadium instead), Kenny Chesney (Chillaxification Tour, though he would perform in 2022), Tim McGraw (Here on Earth Tour), Mötley Crüe, and Def Leppard (The Stadium Tour, though they would perform in 2022). 
On May 2, 2021, the stadium hosted its first major event with spectators present, the filming of the Global Citizen-organized concert special Vax Live: The Concert to Reunite the World, hosted by Selena Gomez and featuring Jennifer Lopez, Eddie Vedder, the Foo Fighters, H.E.R., J Balvin and the Duke of Sussex, which aimed to promote COVID-19 vaccination. 
After COVID-19 restrictions were eased, SoFi Stadium hosted its first in-person concert event by American DJ Kaskade on July 17. Mexican regional music group Los Bukis kicked off their reunion tour on August 27 and 28, filling the stadium to capacity.

On November 27 and 28, and December 1 and 2, the stadium hosted Permission to Dance on Stage—LA, a run of four concerts by the K-pop group BTS. The shows took in a gross of $33.3 million; Billboard reported them to be the highest-grossing concert engagement to ever be held in California, the second-largest in North America overall (surpassed only by a 10-show run at Giants Stadium by Bruce Springsteen), and the highest-grossing run of concerts at a single venue since 2012.

Naming
On September 15, 2019, it was announced that the San Francisco-based financial services company SoFi had acquired the naming rights to the new stadium under a 20-year deal valued at over $30 million per-year, a record for any naming rights for a sports venue. The company became an official partner of both the Rams and the Chargers, as well as a partner of the performance venue and surrounding entertainment district.

The covered open space formerly known as Champions Plaza between the playing field and the performance venue within the stadium was officially named American Airlines Plaza. The airline was named the first founding partner on August 6, 2019.

The performance venue was officially named YouTube Theater on June 28, 2021.

Funding
The stadium was built privately, but as of 2015, the developer was seeking significant tax breaks from Inglewood.

At the commencement of construction, the cost of the stadium was estimated at $2.66 billion. But internal league documents, produced by the NFL in March 2018, indicated a need to raise the debt ceiling for the stadium and facility to a total of $4.963 billion, making it by far, the most expensive sports venue ever built. Team owners voted to approve this new debt ceiling at a meeting that same month. In May 2020, another $500 million in loans was approved by the NFL and the owners.

Teams
The St. Louis Rams were first to commit to moving to the stadium, as NFL approval for their relocation to Los Angeles was obtained on January 12, 2016. The approval, as part of a concession made by Kroenke to get the stadium project and Rams relocation approved, also gave the San Diego Chargers the first option to relocate to Los Angeles and share the stadium with the Rams, conditioned on a negotiated lease agreement between the two teams. The option would have expired on January 15, 2017, at which time the Oakland Raiders would have acquired the same option.

On January 29, 2016, the Rams and the Chargers came to an agreement in principle to share the stadium. Both teams would contribute a $200 million stadium loan from the NFL and personal seat license fees to the construction costs and would pay $1 per year in rent to the facility's controlling entity, StadCo LA, LLC. The same day, Chargers chairman and CEO Dean Spanos announced the team would remain in San Diego for the 2016 NFL season, while continuing to work with local government on a new stadium. Measure C (the Chargers stadium proposal) did not receive the requisite number of votes required for passage.

On January 12, 2017, the Chargers exercised their option and announced plans to relocate to Los Angeles for the 2017 season, making the Chargers the second tenant at the stadium and returning them to the market where they played their inaugural season in 1960. The Chargers exercising of their option led the Raiders to move to Las Vegas, Nevada, instead and begin play at Allegiant Stadium starting in 2020.

The Rams' and the Chargers' move into the stadium marked the return of major professional sports to Inglewood for the first time since the Los Angeles Lakers and Los Angeles Kings left The Forum for Staples Center in Downtown Los Angeles in May 1999.

Major events

NFL

Super Bowl LVI

SoFi Stadium hosted Super Bowl LVI on February 13, 2022, marking the first Super Bowl to be played in the Los Angeles area since Super Bowl XXVII in 1993. The stadium was originally awarded Super Bowl LV (2021) at an NFL owners' meeting in May 2016; in May 2017, because the stadium's opening was delayed to 2020, the NFL chose to re-award Super Bowl LV to Raymond James Stadium in Tampa (which was the remaining city in a pool of four used to determine the hosts of Super Bowl LIII through LV), and award LVI to Los Angeles instead. Because issues may need to be addressed in an inaugural season, the NFL does not allow a stadium to host the Super Bowl during its first season of operation.

In 2022, SoFi Stadium became the first stadium to host a conference championship game and the Super Bowl in the same year. With the Rams winning the 2021 NFC Championship Game, they became only the second team to play a Super Bowl in their home stadium, although the Rams were the away team, since the AFC (Cincinnati Bengals) was the designated home team. With the Rams' victory in Super Bowl LVI, it also became the second stadium to see its main tenant win the Super Bowl.

College football

College Football Playoff National Championship

On November 1, 2017, it was announced that the stadium would host the 2023 College Football Playoff National Championship. The Georgia Bulldogs, winners of the Peach Bowl and TCU Horned Frogs, winners of the Fiesta Bowl played on January 9, 2023. Georgia won 65-7, making it the largest margin of victory in any bowl game at the Football Bowl Subdivision (FBS) level.

LA Bowl

The Mountain West and Pac-12 conferences play a bowl game at SoFi Stadium known as the LA Bowl (officially known as the Jimmy Kimmel LA Bowl presented by Stifel). The conference tie-ins for the game moved from the Las Vegas Bowl. The inaugural edition of the game in 2021 featured Utah State defeating Oregon State 24–13.

Soccer/Association Football

SoFi Stadium hosted a club friendly doubleheader on August 3, 2022, between two Major League Soccer clubs based in Los Angeles and two Liga MX clubs from Mexico: the Los Angeles Galaxy defeated Chivas Guadalajara 2–0; and Los Angeles FC lost in a penalty shootout against Club America. The event was sold out and was part of the Leagues Cup Showcase.

International matches

The stadium will host the 2023 CONCACAF Gold Cup Final on July 16, 2023. It will be the seventh final to be held in the Los Angeles area.

2026 FIFA World Cup

The local bid for Los Angeles in the 2026 FIFA World Cup was organized by private businesses led by AEG with assistance from the Los Angeles Sports and Entertainment District Commission (SoFi Stadium), LAFC, the LA Galaxy, and Rose Bowl Stadium. The Los Angeles City Council approved the bid after private businesses showed support and offered to pay hosting costs. SoFi Stadium was initially not selected as a bidding venue in the winning Canada–Mexico–United States bid because the organizing committee left unbuilt venues out of its final evaluations. The American bid to host the World Cup was selected by FIFA on June 13, 2018, and SoFi stadium will host multiple matches during the tournament. SoFi Stadium is one of sixteen venues set to host matches. It is also one of eleven US venues being used and is one of two venues in California which will host matches, the other being Levi's Stadium in the San Francisco Bay Area. During the event, the stadium will temporarily revert back to its planning name of "Los Angeles Stadium" in accordance with FIFA's policy on corporate sponsored names.

2028 Summer Olympics

SoFi Stadium (which, per prior precedent, will be renamed for the duration of the Games according to sponsorship rules) will host the opening and closing ceremonies of 2028 Summer Olympics and Paralympics (with organizers proposing a split format for the Olympics that would also incorporate the Los Angeles Memorial Coliseum). The stadium will also host archery and soccer (football).

2031 and 2033 Rugby World Cups
Los Angeles is amongst the cities being considered for hosting matches during the 2031 Rugby World Cup and 2033 Women's Rugby World Cup.

WrestleMania

In February 2020, WWE announced that SoFi Stadium would host WrestleMania 37—the 2021 edition of its flagship professional wrestling pay-per-view—on March 28, 2021. The Los Angeles Times had previously reported in April 2019 that SoFi Stadium was a "front-runner" to host a future edition of the event. As WrestleMania 36 in 2020 was not held as an in-person event at Raymond James Stadium due to COVID-19, WWE announced on January 16, 2021, that Inglewood's hosting of the event would be deferred to WrestleMania 39 on April 2, 2023, in favor of hosting WrestleMania 37 in Tampa instead. The event would later be announced as a two-night event, being held on April 1 and 2, 2023. WrestleMania 39 will mark the sixth time that WrestleMania has been held in the Greater Los Angeles area, having last hosted it in 2005 at Staples Center.

Concerts

Hollywood Park

The stadium is located in Hollywood Park, an entertainment complex and master-planned neighborhood named after the former horse racing track that sat on the site. Hollywood Park consists of over  that will be used for office space and condominiums, a 12-screen Cinepolis movie theater, ballrooms, outdoor spaces for community programming, retail, a fitness center, a luxury hotel, a brewery, up-scale restaurants and an open-air shopping and entertainment complex. Immediately adjacent to the stadium is an artificial lake colloquially known as Rivers Lake, with a waterfall and fountain. The first establishment to open in Hollywood Park was the new Hollywood Park Casino, which opened on October 21, 2016.

On September 8, 2021, the NFL opened a new west coast campus in a seven-story office tower at Hollywood Park. One of its main tenants is NFL Media—which operates NFL Films, NFL Network, and the league's digital properties. The league has also used the facility as a secondary hub for replay reviews.

Attached to the southeast corner of the stadium canopy is the YouTube Theater, which seats 6,000.

Public transportation 
The stadium is accessible from bus shuttles to two nearby Los Angeles Metro Rail lines: the C Line at Hawthorne/Lennox station and the K Line at Downtown Inglewood station. These shuttle services operate every five to eight minutes starting three hours prior to kickoff time, and continuing until ninety minutes after the game's conclusion.

A second game-day shuttle line, operated by the city of Gardena's GTrans municipal bus service, originates from the Harbor Gateway Transit Center in Gardena, traveling to SoFi Stadium, with connections to the C Line's Hawthorne/Lennox station. SoFi Stadium is also accessible by several transit bus lines operated by Metro and Torrance Transit.

The city of Inglewood and Los Angeles Metro began talks to build an  automated people mover line that will connect the Downtown Inglewood K Line station with SoFi Stadium, as well as the Forum and the Intuit Dome, the future Los Angeles Clippers basketball arena just south of the Hollywood Park site. The Inglewood Transit Connector will be operated by the city, in conjunction with Metro, and is planned to open in 2027.

In popular culture
 On September 9, 2020, the stadium's construction was the subject of a two-hour special called NFL Super Stadiums on Science Channel.
In December 2021, the stadium was used as the venue for the Influencer Games, a YouTube Originals miniseries hosted by MrBeast (real name Jimmy Donaldson). The first video showed Donaldson put famous YouTubers and TikTokers against each other in a series of mini-games in various parts of the stadium complex, including in YouTube Theater. After that, the second video showed the remaining contestants play a game of hide and seek around the entire complex.
During the first LA Bowl at the stadium, YouTuber Mark Rober teamed up with a local 12 year old named Anthony Hartman to build the world's largest t-shirt cannon per request of Jimmy Kimmel, with all three launching it during the halftime show.
In February 2022, Dude Perfect, along with Mark Rober, hosted the 33rd episode of Overtime, a series by Dude Perfect at the stadium.

See also

 History of the Los Angeles Rams
 History of the Los Angeles Chargers
 History of the National Football League in Los Angeles
 Intuit Dome
List of most expensive buildings
List of current National Football League stadiums
 Kia Forum

References

External links

 
 Hollywood Park website

2020 establishments in California
American football venues in California
Los Angeles Rams stadiums
Los Angeles Chargers stadiums
National Football League venues in Los Angeles
Music venues in Los Angeles
Indoor arenas in California
Kroenke Sports & Entertainment
Hollywood Park
Wrestling venues in Los Angeles
Sports venues completed in 2020
Sports venues in Inglewood, California
Covered stadiums in the United States
21st century in Los Angeles
Venues of the 2028 Summer Olympics
Olympic stadiums
Olympic football venues
Olympic archery venues
Olympic Parks
CONCACAF Gold Cup stadiums
2026 FIFA World Cup Stadiums